The BBCH-scale for root and stem vegetables identifies the phenological development stages of the root and stem vegetables such as carrot, celeriac, kohlrabi, chicory, radish and swede, using the BBCH-scale.

References

External links
A downloadable version of the BBCH Scales

BBCH-scale